Aleksa Urošević (born 9 May 2000) is a Serbian footballer who plays for Bosnian club Radnik Bijeljina.

Career statistics

References

External links
 
 
 

2000 births
Living people
Association football defenders
Serbian footballers
FK Borac Čačak players
FK Spartak Subotica players
FK Radnik Bijeljina players
Serbian First League players
Serbian SuperLiga players
Premier League of Bosnia and Herzegovina players
Serbian expatriate footballers
Expatriate footballers in Bosnia and Herzegovina
Serbian expatriate sportspeople in Bosnia and Herzegovina